Marat Fakhrutdinov (born November 27, 1988) is a Russian professional ice hockey forward who is currently playing with Traktor Chelyabinsk of the Kontinental Hockey League (KHL).

He first played with HC Severstal in the Kontinental Hockey League (KHL).

In the 2014–15 season, Fakhrutdinov played with HC Lada Togliatti before he was released from his one-year contract on November 4, 2014. On November 16, 2014, he was signed by Traktor Chelyabinsk for the remainder of the season.

References

External links

1988 births
Living people
HC Dynamo Moscow players
HC Lada Togliatti players
Severstal Cherepovets players
Traktor Chelyabinsk players
Russian ice hockey forwards